Longfields-Davidson Heights Secondary School is a public school in Barrhaven, a suburb of Ottawa, Ontario, Canada. It was founded in 2009.

Faculty 
The school opened in September 2009 providing services for grades 7 to 12. The staff has grown to over 150 and the student population exceeds 2250. In 2013, it was announced that Longfields would be receiving a 15.2 million dollar expansion to accommodate for the growing student population.

Arts

Sports 
During the fall season of the 2014–2015 school year Longfields, had four teams qualify for Ontario Federation of School Athletic Associations (OFSAA) championships. The Senior Boys Soccer Team, Senior Girls Basketball Team, and the Varsity Girls Field Hockey team all brought home city championships.

See also
List of high schools in Ontario

References

Middle schools in Ottawa
Educational institutions established in 2009
High schools in Ottawa
2009 establishments in Ontario